Events from the year 1806 in the United States.

Incumbents

Federal Government 
 President: Thomas Jefferson (DR-Virginia )
 Vice President: George Clinton (DR-New York)
 Chief Justice: John Marshall (Virginia)
 Speaker of the House of Representatives: Nathaniel Macon (DR-North Carolina)
 Congress: 9th

Events
 March 23 – The Lewis and Clark Expedition and their Corps of Discovery, having reached the Pacific Ocean after traveling through the Louisiana Purchase, begins its journey home.
 March 28 – Washington College (modern-day Washington & Jefferson College) is chartered by the Pennsylvania General Assembly.
 March 29 – Construction is authorized of the National Road (the first United States federal highway).
 April 18 – The U.S. Congress passes the Non-importation Act in an attempt to coerce Great Britain to suspend its impressment of American sailors and to respect American sovereignty and neutrality on the high seas.
 May 30 – Future President Andrew Jackson fights his second duel, killing Charles Dickinson who had accused Jackson's wife of bigamy; Jackson has a bullet lodged close to his heart.
 July 4 – Ship The Irish Rover sets sail from the Cove of Cork, Ireland for New York.
 July 7 – Cornerstone laid for America's First Cathedral, now known as the Baltimore Basilica.  Architect: Benjamin Latrobe.
 July 15 – Pike Expedition: Near St. Louis, Missouri, United States Army Lieutenant Zebulon Pike leads an expedition from Fort Bellefontaine to explore the west.
 August 14 – The Lewis and Clark Expedition re-visit the Mandan Indians while making its return trip to St. Louis.
 September 23 – The Lewis and Clark Expedition reaches St. Louis, Missouri, ending a successful exploration of the Louisiana Territory and the Pacific Northwest.
 November 15 – Pike Expedition: During his second exploratory expedition, Lieutenant Zebulon Pike sees a distant mountain peak while near the Colorado foothills of the Rocky Mountains which is later named Pikes Peak in his honor.

Undated
 Noah Webster publishes A Compendious Dictionary of the English Language, his first American English dictionary.
 Parson Weems publishes a 2nd edition of his The Life of George Washington, with curious anecdotes laudable to himself and exemplary to his countrymen, first including the story of the young Washington and the cherry-tree.

Ongoing 

 Lewis and Clark Expedition (1803-1806)

Births

 February 10 – Orville Hickman Browning, U.S. Senator from Illinois from 1866 to 1869 (died 1881)
 March 4
 George Bradburn, abolitionist and women's rights advocate (died 1880)
 Ephraim Wales Bull, farmer, creator of the Concord grape (died 1895)
 March 12 – Jane Pierce, First Lady of the United States (died 1863)
 June 18 – Abijah Gilbert, U.S. Senator from Florida from 1869 to 1875 (died 1881)
 September 12 – Andrew Hull Foote, naval officer in the American Civil War (died 1863)
 October 3 – Oliver Cowdery, religious leader (died 1850)
 November 22 – Lafayette S. Foster, U.S. Senator from Connecticut from 1855 to 1867 (died 1880)
 December 12 – Stand Watie, Cherokee Nation leader and Confederate General in the American Civil War (died 1871)

Deaths
 February 20 – Lachlan McIntosh, military and political leader (born 1725)
 April 10 – Horatio Gates, British soldier who served as an American general in the American Revolutionary War (born 1727 in Great Britain)
 May 30 – Charles Dickinson, attorney that Andrew Jackson killed (in a duel) after Dickinson accused Jackson's wife of bigamy (born 1780)
 October 9 – Benjamin Banneker, astronomer, surveyor (born 1731)
 October 25 – Henry Knox, first United States Secretary of War, military officer of the Continental Army and later the United States Army (born 1750)

See also
 Timeline of the Lewis and Clark Expedition
 Timeline of United States history (1790–1819)

References

Further reading
 Nathaniel Bowditch. Observations on the Total Eclipse of the Sun June 16, 1806, Made at Salem. Memoirs of the American Academy of Arts and Sciences, Vol. 3, No. 1 (1809), pp. 18–22
 Simeon De Witt. Observations on the Eclipse of 16 June 1806, Made by Simeon De Witt Esq. of Albany, State of New-York, Addressed to Benjamin Rush M. D. to Be by Him Communicated to the American Philosophical Society. Transactions of the American Philosophical Society, Vol. 6, (1809), pp. 300–302
 The Massachusetts Election in 1806. Proceedings of the Massachusetts Historical Society, Second Series, Vol. 20, [Vol. 40 of continuous numbering] (1906–1907), pp. 1–21
 Herbert E. Bolton. Papers of Zebulon M. Pike, 1806–1807. The American Historical Review, Vol. 13, No. 4 (July, 1908), pp. 798–827
 J. Madison. William and Mary College, July 4, 1806. The William and Mary Quarterly, Second Series, Vol. 3, No. 3 (July, 1923), pp. 201–205
 Elizabeth Heyward Jervey. Marriage and Death Notices from the Charleston Courier 1806. The South Carolina Historical and Genealogical Magazine, Vol. 30, No. 2 (April, 1929), pp. 117–124
 W. E. Hollon. Zebulon Montgomery Pike's Mississippi Voyage, 1805–1806. The Wisconsin Magazine of History, Vol. 32, No. 4 (June, 1949), pp. 445–455
 W. H. G. Armytage. A Sheffield Quaker in Philadelphia 1804–1806. Pennsylvania History, Vol. 17, No. 3 (1950), pp. 192–205
 Anthony Steel. Impressment in the Monroe-Pinkney Negotiation, 1806–1807. The American Historical Review, Vol. 57, No. 2 (January, 1952), pp. 352–369
 George S. Snyderman. Halliday Jackson's Journal of a Visit Paid to the Indians of New York (1806). Proceedings of the American Philosophical Society, Vol. 101, No. 6, Studies of Historical Documents in the Library of the American Philosophical Society (December 19, 1957), pp. 565–588
 John H. Reinoehl. Some Remarks on the American Trade: Jacob Crowninshield to James Madison 1806. The William and Mary Quarterly, Third Series, Vol. 16, No. 1 (January, 1959), pp. 83–118
 Ludwell Lee Montague. Cornelia Lee's Wedding. As Reported in a Letter from Ann Calvert Stuart to Mrs. Elizabeth Lee, October 19, 1806. The Virginia Magazine of History and Biography, Vol. 80, No. 4 (October, 1972), pp. 453–460
 William G. McLoughlin. Thomas Jefferson and the Beginning of Cherokee Nationalism, 1806 to 1809. The William and Mary Quarterly, Third Series, Vol. 32, No. 4 (October, 1975), pp. 548–580
 Robert E. Moody, Leverett Saltonstall. Leverett Saltonstall: A Diary Beginning January AD. 1806. Proceedings of the Massachusetts Historical Society, Third Series, Vol. 89, (1977), pp. 127–177
 John M. Bryan. Robert Mills, Benjamin Henry Latrobe, Thomas Jefferson, and the South Carolina Penitentiary Project, 1806–1808. The South Carolina Historical Magazine, Vol. 85, No. 1 (January, 1984), pp. 1–21
 Dan L. Flores. The Ecology of the Red River in 1806: Peter Custis and Early Southwestern Natural History. The Southwestern Historical Quarterly, Vol. 88, No. 1 (July, 1984), pp. 1–42
 Donald R. Hickey. The Monroe-Pinkney Treaty of 1806: A Reappraisal. The William and Mary Quarterly, Third Series, Vol. 44, No. 1 (January, 1987), pp. 65–88
 John Taylor, Wilson Cary Nicholas, David N. Mayer. Of Principles and Men: The Correspondence of John Taylor of Caroline with Wilson Cary Nicholas 1806–1808. The Virginia Magazine of History and Biography, Vol. 96, No. 3, "The Example of Virginia Is a Powerful Thing": The Old Dominion and the Constitution, 1788–1988 (July, 1988), pp. 345–388
 James P. Ronda. A Moment in Time: The West: September 1806. Montana: The Magazine of Western History, Vol. 44, No. 4 (Autumn, 1994), pp. 2–15
 Dan Flores. A Very Different Story: Exploring the Southwest from Monticello with the Freeman and Custis Expedition of 1806. Montana: The Magazine of Western History, Vol. 50, No. 1 (Spring, 2000), pp. 2–17
 Matthew E. Mason. Slavery Overshadowed: Congress Debates Prohibiting the Atlantic Slave Trade to the United States, 1806–1807. Journal of the Early Republic, Vol. 20, No. 1 (Spring, 2000), pp. 59–81

External links
 

 
1800s in the United States
United States
United States
Years of the 19th century in the United States